Mahmoud Nasr was a critically acclaimed Egyptian cinematographer of the 1950s and 1960s.

He worked in the Egyptian film industry between 1949 and 1969 and shot acclaimed Egyptian films such as Ard el salam in 1957.

Filmography
Moutarada gharamia (1968)
Ragol el-lazi fakad zilloh, El (1968)
... aka The Man Who Lost His Shadow (International: English title: informal literal title) 
Agazet gharam (1967)
Moukhareboun, Al (1967)
Talata yuhebbunaha, El (1966) (director of photography)
... aka All Three Love Her (International: English title) 
Morahekan, El (1964)
... aka The Two Young Men (International: English title) 
Ana hurra (1958)
... aka I Am Free (International: English title) 
Hatta naltaki (1958)
... aka I'll See You (International: English title) 
La anam (1958)
... aka No Tomorrow (International: English title) 
Zoja el azraa, El (1958) (director of photography)
... aka The Virgin Wife (International: English title) 
Ard el salam (1957)
... aka Land of Peace (International: English title) 
Kursi el iteraf (1949)
... aka The Secret of the Confessional (International: English title)

External links
 

Year of birth missing (living people)
Egyptian cinematographers
Possibly living people